The qualifying rounds for the 2008–09 UEFA Cup began on 17 July 2008. In total, there were two qualifying rounds which narrowed clubs down to 80 teams in preparation for the first round.

First qualifying round

|-
!colspan="5"|Southern-Mediterranean region

|-
!colspan="5"|Central-East region

|-
!colspan="5"|Northern region

|}

First leg

Second leg

Nordsjælland win 8–0 on aggregate

Manchester City win 4–0 on aggregate

St Patrick's Athletic win 3–0 on aggregate

2–2 on aggregate, Djurgården win on away goals

Sūduva win 2–0 on aggregate

København win 11–0 on aggregate

Haka win 6–2 on aggregate

Midtjylland win 10–1 on aggregate

Cherno More win 9–0 on aggregate

APOEL win 1–0 on aggregate

Zrinjski Mostar win 5–1 on aggregate

Široki Brijeg win 3–1 on aggregate

Ironi Kiryat Shmona win 4–1 on aggregate

Vllaznia Shkodër win 2–1 on aggregate

Ljubljana win 2–1 on aggregate

Hapoel Tel Aviv win 5–0 on aggregate

Hajduk Split win 7–0 on aggregate

Omonia win 4–1 on aggregate

Slaven Belupo win 8–0 on aggregate

Salzburg win 10–0 on aggregate

Győr win 3–2 on aggregate

Bellinzona win 4–1 on aggregate

Borac Čačak win 4–2 on aggregate

Austria Wien win 2–1 on aggregate

Hertha BSC win 8–1 on aggregate

Lech Poznań win 5–1 on aggregate

Legia Warszawa win 4–1 on aggregate

WIT win 3–2 on aggregate

MŠK Žilina win 3–2 on aggregate

Debrecen win 2–1 on aggregate

Vojvodina win 2–1 on aggregate

FH win 8–3 on aggregate

Viking win 2–1 on aggregate

Kalmar win 10–1 on aggregate

Honka win 4–2 on aggregate

Liepājas Metalurgs win 3–1 on aggregate

Brøndby win 3–0 on aggregate

Notes
Note 1: Played in Lugano at Cornaredo Stadium as Bellinzona's Stadio Comunale Bellinzona did not meet UEFA criteria.

Second qualifying round

|-
!colspan="5"|Southern-Mediterranean region

|-
!colspan="5"|Central-East region

|-
!colspan="5"|Northern region

|}

First leg

Match played as a one off in Austria due to political unrest in Georgia

Second leg

Borac Čačak win 2–1 on aggregate

Nordsjælland win 4–2 on aggregate

Kalmar win 5–2 on aggregate

1–1 on aggregate, Manchester City win 4–2 on penalties

Honka win 2–1 on aggregate

Brøndby win 6–0 on aggregate

Rennes win 3–2 on aggregate

Copenhagen win 7–3 on aggregate

St Patrick's win 4–3 on aggregate

Aston Villa win 5–2 on aggregate

Beşiktaş win 6–1 on aggregate

Braga win 3–0 on aggregate

Hapoel Tel Aviv win 3–0 on aggregate

Slaven Belupo win 2–1 on aggregate

Litex Lovech win 2–1 on aggregate

Deportivo win 2–0 on aggregate

APOEL 5–5 Red Star Belgrade on aggregate, APOEL win on away goals

Napoli win 8–0 on aggregate

Cherno More win 3–1 on aggregate

Omonia win 3–2 on aggregate

Vaslui win 5–1 on aggregate

Zürich 2–2 Sturm Graz on aggregate. Zürich won 4–2 on penalties.

Stuttgart win 6–2 on aggregate

Lech Poznań win 6–0 on aggregate

Žilina win 4–2 on aggregate

Match played as a one off in Austria due to political unrest in Georgia.

Young Boys win 7–3 on aggregate

FC Moscow win 4–1 on aggregate

4–4 on aggregate, Bellinzona win on away goals

Hertha BSC win 3–0 on aggregate

Salzburg win 4–2 on aggregate

Rosenborg win 6–2 on aggregate

Notes
Note 2: Played in Lugano at Cornaredo Stadium as Bellinzona's Stadio Comunale Bellinzona did not meet UEFA criteria.

References

External links
Qualifying Rounds Information

Qualifying
July 2008 sports events in Europe
August 2008 sports events in Europe
UEFA Cup qualifying rounds